Odra Sisačka ( is a village in Croatia. It is part of the city of Sisak; population 823. It is connected by the D36 highway.

References

Populated places in Sisak-Moslavina County